A tampion or tompion (in the Royal Navy) is a wooden plug, or a metal, canvas, rubber, or plastic cover, for the muzzle of a gun or mortar. Tampions can be found on both land-based artillery and naval guns. Naval tampions have developed into works of art.

History 
Although the cannon of ships of the line were protected as they were retracted inside the ships, many smaller vessels had exposed gundecks which required a plug to protect inside of the barrels. To combat rust when ships were not in action the barrels were sealed, both with a tampion and plugs in the touch hole. A quantity of olive oil and a round shot were left inside in the barrel; With the gun laid horizontally the shot would roll up and down the barrel as the ship caught each wave, effectively lubricating the gun simply through the motion of the ship.

Later, the invention of revolving gun turrets meant that all guns were constantly exposed to water. Hence, when not in use, naval guns were protected by wooden, and, later, rubber, muzzle plugs. They were also used to protect the barrel whenever the guns were placed in storage, for example in the hold where moisture could cause corrosion, and sealed in with putty.

Typically, rubber and plastic tampions can be shot through in case of an emergency. Plastic tampions are normally designed to be expelled by the build-up of pressure in the barrel as the first shell is fired.

Over time, tampions were embossed or engraved with the arms of the unit, and they became collector's items. Nowadays, even warships that typically would not carry heavy guns, such as submarines, have their own badges in the shape of a tampion.

References

Further reading

Images

Artillery components
Firearm muzzle devices